Rômulo Cabral Pereira Pinto (born 2 November 1991 in Rio de Janeiro), commonly known as Rômulo,  is a Brazilian footballer for Thai League 1 club Police Tero.

Career

Brazil
Rômulo was born in Rio de Janeiro and started his career at the local club Botafogo. He, however, made his senior debut for Friburguense in the Campeonato Carioca during 2012. During the upcoming years, Rômulo would make a name for himself in the Brazilian lower divisions. He represented Friburguense in the during two different spells, making 74 appearances and scoring 21 goals in total.

Hammarby IF
In February 2016, Rômulo was scouted by Nanne Bergstrand, then manager of Hammarby IF in Allsvenskan. A month later, in March, Rômulo move abroad for the first time in his career by signing a two year-deal with the Swedish club. The transfer fee was reportedly set at 0,5 million Swedish kronor (approximately £55.000), as Friburguense sold their main striker due to financial difficulties.

After a tough start to his newly found career in Europe, mostly being used as a substitute player, Rômulo scored a hat-trick on 17 October 2016 against local rivals Djurgården in a spectacular derby fixture, helping his side secure a 4–2 win. Rômulo's involvement in the victory was later awarded as the "achievement of the year" by the club's supporters.

On 2 April 2017, Rômulo scored on the first match day of Allsvenskan, in a 2–1 away loss against IFK Norrköping. Throughout the first half of the season, Rômulo was used as the second choice striker behind Pa Dibba in new manager Jakob Michelsen's squad. On 4 June, Rômulo once again enjoyed a superb performance against arch rival Djurgårdens IF. He scored a brace as Hammarby won 3–1 on home turf. He was, however, used sparingly during the remainder of season and left the club at the expiration of his contract.

Career statistics

Club

Notes

Style of play
Mats Jingblad, former director of football at Hammarby, has praised Rômulo as technical player with a great willingness to run and a strong defensive play.

References

External links

1991 births
Living people
Brazilian footballers
Brazilian expatriate footballers
Association football forwards
Botafogo de Futebol e Regatas players
Friburguense Atlético Clube players
Club Athletico Paranaense players
Associação Ferroviária de Esportes players
Paulista Futebol Clube players
Hammarby Fotboll players
Suphanburi F.C. players
BG Pathum United F.C. players
SC Sagamihara players
Khon Kaen United F.C. players
Police Tero F.C. players
Campeonato Brasileiro Série D players
Allsvenskan players
J2 League players
J3 League players
Thai League 1 players
Brazilian expatriate sportspeople in Sweden
Brazilian expatriate sportspeople in Thailand
Brazilian expatriate sportspeople in Japan
Expatriate footballers in Sweden
Expatriate footballers in Thailand
Expatriate footballers in Japan
Footballers from Rio de Janeiro (city)